Mukhi (mukhia) is the title used for a head of community or village elites and their local government in Western India and the Sindh. It is derived from the word "mukhiya" meaning "foremost" and prior to Indian Independence, they were the most power person in each community imbued with both civil and judicial powers.

Status
Mukhi headmen generally came from the wealthiest  or most prominent families within their community  and acted as the president of the local panchayats. According to local traditions, the mukhi could be a hereditary position inherited by the eldest son  or an elected position, as were the panchayats. Decisions made by the panchayat were accepted by their communities and did not require enforcement.

In developed areas, many also held high positions in business.

History
The tradition of mukhis and panchayat raj (village self-government) is thought to be thousands of years old but currently decreasing in influence due to the growth of government and democratic decentralisation.

Since at least the 16th Century, the roles carried out by mukhis included those relating to local revenue gathering and expenditure, policing and justice. By the 19th, under the British rule of India, they became government appointed agents. They led local Panchayats and acted as local representative of the rulers.

In 1876, according to the Village Police Act, the mukhis were also given central roles in the criminal justice system and required to carry out surveillance about suspicious activities and reporting to district level officials. They had powers to resolve conflicts within their community, particularly those relating to marriages, and give consent over the building of properties and  officiate over daily events or rituals.

In Hyderabad, the position was always held by a member of the Bhaibund community who presided over the collection of fines for the violation of duties and obligations.

Ismailism
In the Ismaili Nizari tradition, the term is also used for the guardian of each Jama'at Khana where the Mukhi acts as the tangible symbol of the Imam's authority. officiating over daily rituals,

Family name
Mukhi is also a common name within Sindhi denoting a hereditary relationship to a mukhi  and, from a separate root, in other Indian communities as meaning "beautiful".
The spelling of the name has been altered by some families outside of India to Mukhey.

See also
 Fouzdar
 Zamindar
 Talati
 Sarpanch
 Panchayats
 Local self-government in India

References

Sources
 Bherumal Mahirchand Advani, "Amilan-jo-Ahwal" - published in Sindhi, 1919
 Amilan-jo-Ahwal (1919) - translated into English in 2016 ("A History of the Amils") at sindhis
Society of India
Society of Sindh
Local government in India
Indian surnames
Sindhi tribes